Hoosier Creek is a stream in Linn and Johnson counties, Iowa, in the United States.

A large share of the early settlers on Hoosier Creek being natives of Indiana (Hoosiers) caused the name to be selected.

See also
List of rivers of Iowa

References

Rivers of Johnson County, Iowa
Rivers of Linn County, Iowa
Rivers of Iowa